Sharansky (masculine), Sharanskaya (feminine), or Sharanskoye (neuter) may refer to:
Natan Sharansky (born 1948), Soviet refusenik during the 1970s and 1980s, Israeli author and politician
Sharansky District, a district of the Republic of Bashkortostan, Russia

See also
Sharanski, a rural locality in Palkinsky District, Pskov Oblast, Russia